The Depaldo Stone Steps (also ) in Taganrog in Russia were constructed in 1823. They were the project of the Italian architect Francesco Boffo, with the funding of Taganrog's Greek merchant Gerasim Depaldo, at the crossroads of Greek Street (near Tchaikovsky House in Taganrog) and Depaldo Street (now Turgenevskaya Street) in Taganrog. The stairway begins up on the hill in downtown and goes down ending near the Sea of Azov foreshore (Pushkin Embankment).

In Imperial Russia they were the famous stairs in South Russia, similar to the Potemkin Stairs in Odessa.

In World War II, the Old Stone Steps were heavily damaged, but stayed one of the major tourist attractions of Taganrog. In the 1970s they were reconstructed, but not finished. The new major reconstruction was made in 2005. During the latest reconstruction all the old stone steps were replaced by new stones.

At the top of the steps on Grecheskaya Street stands a sundial (1833). 

One of the short stories written by Soviet Russian Ivan Vasilenko titled Sundial was dedicated to the sundial near the Old Stone Steps.

Views of Depaldo stone stairs

References

 Энциклопедия Таганрога. — Ростов-на-Дону: Ростиздат, 2003
 Гаврюшкин О.П. По старой Греческой... (Хроника обывательской жизни). — Таганрог: Лукоморье, 2003. — 514 с. — .

Buildings and structures in Taganrog
Buildings and structures completed in 1823
Taganrog
Stairways
Tourist attractions in Taganrog
Cultural heritage monuments in Taganrog
Cultural heritage monuments of regional significance in Rostov Oblast